David Michael Gonski  (born 7 October 1953) is an Australian public figure and businessman.

In 2008, The Sydney Morning Herald described Gonski as "one of the country's best-connected businessmen" and dubbed him "Mr Networks" for being "arguably Sydney's most networked man". A profile in 2010 by Australian author and Herald columnist Malcolm Knox said that Gonski is "a quiet man, in some ways invisible, and cleaves to the shadows."

Early life and education
Gonski was born in Cape Town, South Africa, and his family migrated to Australia in 1961 in the wake of the Sharpeville massacre. Gonski's father, Alexander, was a neurosurgeon of Polish background and a founding member of The Coast Golf Club at Little Bay, New South Wales. His mother is Helene Blume. In a 2010 interview, Gonski recalls that one of his earliest recollections was his mother buying a lithograph by Australian artist, Charles Blackman; commenting that "there's no doubt that my love for Australian art came from her." Gonski is Jewish. He attended Sydney Grammar School and the University of New South Wales, where he graduated with a Bachelor of Commerce degree in 1976 and a Bachelor of Laws degree (with the University Medal) in 1977.

Early career
Gonski practised as a solicitor with the firm of Freehills from 1977 to 1986, becoming their youngest ever partner at age 25, before leaving to co-found an investment bank. While at Freehills, he taught intellectual property law for the Faculty of Law at the University of New South Wales.

He established a corporate advisory firm, Wentworth Associates Pty Ltd, which was acquired by Investec Bank in March 2001.

Business leadership
Gonski's business background is extensive, and it is estimated that he sits on more than 40 boards. Current prominent positions held in business include chairman, independent non-executive director of ANZ Bank; Ingeus Limited; Swiss Re Life and Health Australia Limited; ASX Limited (since 2008); and Investec Bank (Australia) Limited. He is a senior adviser to Morgan Stanley Australia Limited; chairman of the advisory board of Transfield Holdings (the private holding company of Transfield Services); and is a non-executive director of Singapore Airlines.

His previous roles have included non-executive director of John Fairfax Holdings (between 1993 and 2005); ANZ Bank (between 2001 and 2007); Westfield Group (between 1985 and 2011); Consolidated Press; non-executive director and chair of Coca-Cola Amatil (1997 to 2017; and ING Australia.

However, not all Gonski's efforts have yielded strong results. During the mid-1980s on Gonski's advice, Frank Lowy established Westfield Capital Corporation with Gonski as an advisor. WCC invested in the predecessor of Ten Network Holdings that eventually resulted in Westfield losing several hundred million dollars.

In August 2022, Gonski was appointed Chair of new retirement living provider Levande by EQT Infrastructure, following the acquisition of Stockland Group's 58 villages across New South Wales, Victoria, Queensland, South Australia and the Australian Capital Territory.

Community leadership
In 1999, Gonski was appointed as a director to the UNSW Foundation. He became chancellor of the University of New South Wales and a member of the council of the university in 2005 and in 2007 became chair of the UNSW Foundation. Gonski is the first alumnus of the University of New South Wales to hold the position of chancellor at that university.

He is chairman of the National e-Health Transition Authority, a statutory authority of the Australian government; and chair of the Sydney Theatre Company (since February 2010). Gonski is a non-executive director of Infrastructure NSW, an agency of the New South Wales Government. He is a member of the nomination panel for appointments to the boards of the Australian Broadcasting Corporation and Special Broadcasting Service and is patron of Raise Foundation and the Australian Indigenous Education Foundation.

Amidst some controversy, Gonski succeeded David Murray as independent non-executive chairman of the Australian Government Future Fund on 3 April 2012.

During 2011, Gonski was chair of the expert advisory panel of the Commonwealth Government's Review of the Funding of Schools in Australia, which the media commonly refers to as "the Gonski review". He has also served on the Takeovers Panel, an advisory body for the Commonwealth government. During 1996 and 1997, Gonski undertook a Review of Commonwealth Assistance to the Film Industry, presenting his report of that review in 1997. He was also a member of the committee appointed in 1998 to conduct an Inquiry into the Major Performing Arts Sector.

Gonski's previous positions held include chair of the Australia Council for the Arts (between 2002 and 2006); president of the board of trustees of the Art Gallery of New South Wales (since 1997); chair of the National Institute of Dramatic Art; chair of the board of trustees of Sydney Grammar School (between 2003 and 2010); chair of Film Australia.

At various times he has served on the boards of St Vincent's Hospital, Sydney; the Bundanon Trust; Philanthropy Australia; and the Australia-Israel Chamber of Commerce; and other non-profit entities.

Gonski Reports
In April 2010, Gonski was commissioned by Julia Gillard, then Minister for Education in the Rudd Government, to be chairman of a committee to make recommendations regarding funding of education in Australia. The findings and recommendations of the committee were presented to the government in November 2011, whereafter deliberations were entered into by the federal and state governments to consider its content. The committee's report is known as the Gonski Report. Subsequently, the proposed reforms (an increase in funding) became known as "Gonski" and supporters urged governments to "Give a Gonski". The report was removed from the website by the incoming government after the 2013 federal election and is preserved by Australia's Pandora Archive.

In 2017, Gonski chaired an independent panel, the Review to Achieve Educational Excellence in Australian Schools, commissioned to examine evidence and make recommendations on how school funding should be used to improve school performance and student outcomes. The second Gonski report, referred to as Gonski 2.0, was published on 30 April 2018.

Personal life
Gonski was a close friend and advisor to the late media baron Kerry Packer. Together with Lloyd Williams, he was an executor of Packer's estate. While he provided advice to Packer, Gonski was also a director of Packer's media competitor, John Fairfax Holdings. He is close friends with Izzy Asper, Arthur Boyd, Rupert Murdoch, Kerry Stokes and Frank Lowy. His mentor was the late Kim Santow.

Gonski is married to a Boston-born dermatologist Orli Wargon, with whom he has three children: Michael, Kate and Timothy.

Honours
In 2002, Gonski was appointed an Officer of the Order of Australia (AO) for service to the community through Australian visual and performing arts organisations, through the development of government policy, and through the promotion of corporate sponsorship for the arts and for charitable organisations. He received the Centenary Medal in 2003. In 2007 Gonski was invested as a Companion of the Order of Australia (AC) for service to the arts through charitable support and the development of policy initiatives, to business and commerce as a company director, to education, and to the community through a range of philanthropic endeavours.

At the University of New South Wales, Law Theatre G02 is named the Gonski Levy Theatre in his honour.

In 2013, Gonski was ranked No. 19 on the Sovereign Wealth Fund Institute's Public Investor 100, and in 2018 named in the top five influencers in Australian education by the Australian Financial Review.

Gonski is a life fellow of the Australian Institute of Company Directors and a fellow of CPA Australia.

References 

1953 births
Australian Jews
Australian solicitors
Australian people of Polish-Jewish descent
Businesspeople from Sydney
Companions of the Order of Australia
People educated at Sydney Grammar School
People from Cape Town
South African emigrants to Australia
South African Jews
South African people of Polish-Jewish descent
Academic staff of the University of New South Wales
University of New South Wales Law School alumni
Living people
Chancellors of the University of New South Wales
Australia and New Zealand Banking Group
Directors and Presidents of the Art Gallery of New South Wales